Souconna is a  Celtic goddess, the deity of the river Saône at Chalon-sur-Saône, to whom epigraphic invocation was made.

References 
 Dictionary of Celtic Myth and Legend. Miranda Green. Thames and Hudson Ltd. London. 1997

Gaulish goddesses
Sea and river goddesses
Personifications of rivers